McCune–Reischauer romanization is one of the two most widely used Korean language romanization systems. A modified version of McCune–Reischauer was the official romanization system in South Korea until 2002, when it was replaced by the Revised Romanization of Korean system introduced two years earlier. A variant of McCune–Reischauer is still used as the official system in North Korea.

The system was first published in 1939 by George M. McCune and Edwin O. Reischauer. With a few exceptions, it attempts not to transliterate Korean hangul, but it represents the phonetic pronunciation.

Characteristics and criticism 

Under the McCune–Reischauer system, aspirated consonants like p, k, and t are distinguished by apostrophes from unaspirated ones, which may also be falsely understood as a separator between syllables (as in  → twichagi, which consists of the syllables twi, chʼa and gi). These diverse applications of apostrophes made people confused once omitted. Also, the breve is used to differentiate vowels in Korean.

An omission of the apostrophe on the internet and lack of a breve on keyboards were the primary reasons the South Korean government adopted a revised system of romanization in 2000. However, the counterargument for this assertion is that it is impossible to find perfectly matching pairs of letters between the two different writing systems, Latin script and Hangul, and priority should be given to revised system of romanization created by the help of many Korean linguists at the National Academy of the Korean Language over a five-year period than the McCune–Reischauer system created by two foreigners with the help of three Korean linguists over a two-year period during the Japanese colonial era.

Despite official adoption of the new system in South Korea, North Korea continues to use a version of McCune–Reischauer.

Guide 
This is a simplified guide for the McCune–Reischauer system.

Vowels 

Consonants 

 The consonant digraphs exist only as finals and are transcribed by their actual pronunciation.

 ㅇ is an initial consonant before a vowel to indicate the absence of sound.
 쉬 is romanized shwi.
 In Sino-Korean words, lt and lch respectively.

For ㄱ, ㄷ, ㅂ, and ㅈ, the letters g, d, b, or j are used if voiced, k, t, p, or ch otherwise. Pronunciations such as those take precedence over the rules in the table above.

Examples 
 Voiceless/voiced consonants
 가구 kagu
 등대 tŭngdae
 반복 
 주장 chujang
 r vs. l
 r
 Between two vowels: 가로 karo, 필요 p'iryo
 Before initial ㅎ h: 발해 Parhae, 실험 sirhŏm
 l
 Before a consonant (except before initial ㅎ h), or at the end of a word: 날개 nalgae, 구별 kubyŏl, 결말 kyŏlmal
 ㄹㄹ is written ll: 빨리 , 저절로 chŏjŏllo
 Consonant assimilations
 독립 (pronounced 동닙) tongnip
 법률 (pronounced 범뉼) pŏmnyul
 않다 (pronounced 안타) ant’a
 맞히다 (pronounced 마치다) mach’ida
 Palatalizations
 미닫이 (pronounced 미다지) 
 같이 (pronounced 가치) kach’i
 굳히다 (pronounced 구치다) kuch’ida

Exceptions that do not predict pronunciation 
 The sequences -ㄱㅎ-, -ㄷㅎ- (only when palatalization does not occur)/-ㅅㅎ-, -ㅂㅎ- are written kh, th, ph respectively, even though they are pronounced the same as ㅋ (k), ㅌ (t), ㅍ (p).
 속히 sokhi (pronounced 소키)
 못하다 mothada (pronounced 모타다)
 곱하기 kophagi (pronounced 고파기)
 When a plain consonant (ㄱ, ㄷ, ㅂ, ㅅ, or ㅈ) becomes a tensed consonant (ㄲ, ㄸ, ㅃ, ㅆ, or ㅉ) in the middle of a word, it is written k, t, p, s, or ch respectively, even though it is pronounced the same as ㄲ (kk), ㄸ (tt), ㅃ (pp), ㅆ (ss), or ㅉ (tch).
 태권도 (pronounced 태꿘도) t'aekwŏndo
 손등 (pronounced 손뜽) sontŭng
 문법 (pronounced 문뻡) munpŏp
 국수 (pronounced 국쑤) kuksu
 한자 (漢字, pronounced 한짜) hancha

Other systems 
A third system, the Yale Romanization system, which is a transliteration system, exists but is used only in academic literature, especially in linguistics.

The Kontsevich system, based on the earlier Kholodovich system, is used for transliterating Korean into the Cyrillic script. Like McCune–Reischauer romanization it attempts to represent the pronunciation of a word, rather than provide letter-to-letter correspondence.

Reference

See also 
 Hangul
 New Korean Orthography

Footnotes

External links 
 A Practical Guide to McCune–Reischauer Romanization: Rules, guidelines, and font
 Comparison table of different romanization systems from UN Working Group on Romanization Systems (PDF file)
 PDF files of the 1939 paper, and the 1961 paper
 
 Online tool for McCune–Reischauer romanization (with BGN modifications)

Romanization of Korean